Zoe Levin (born November 24, 1993) is an American actress. She played Emily in the 2013 film Palo Alto and Tasha in Beneath the Harvest Sky. She  portrayed  Kara Souders in  the Fox TV show Red Band Society. She played Tiffany "Tiff" Chester in the 2019 Netflix dark comedy Bonding. She is also part of the unreleased film The Long Home, directed by James Franco.

Personal life 
Levin was born in Chicago and moved to Glencoe when she was 11. She is from a Jewish family and attended the elementary and junior high school in Glencoe before graduating from New Trier High School.

She began acting at an early age and had tried out for her first professional play when she was 13. She then relocated to Los Angeles to study communication and fine arts at Loyola Marymount University. Her acting career kicked off in 2010 when she was selected to play a role in David Schwimmer's film Trust. This came after her performances at Chicago's Looking Glass Theatre.

Levin is currently living in Chicago, US.

Filmography

References

External links

1993 births
Living people
21st-century American actresses
21st-century American Jews
Actresses from Chicago
American film actresses
American television actresses
Jewish American actresses
New Trier High School alumni
People from Chicago
People from Glencoe, Illinois